A list of films produced in Hong Kong in 1993:

1993

External links
IMDB list of Hong Kong films
Hong Kong films of 1993 at HKcinemamagic.com

1993
Hong Kong
1993 in Hong Kong